The Simmons College Center for the Study of Children's Literature is an academic program at Simmons College specializing in the critical study of children's literature.  The program was founded in 1977, and was the first program in the United States to offer a master's degree in the field.

Currently, the program offers an MA and an MFA.  It also offers an institute to the children's literature academic community in alternate summers.  Guest speakers in previous years have included such notables as Louis Sachar, Maurice Sendak, Robert Cormier, Daniel Handler, and Lois Lowry.  In 1986, a collection of speeches from the summer institute was published as Innocence and Experience: Essays and Conversations on Children's Literature, edited by Gregory Maguire and Barbara Harrison.  The Lion and the Unicorn Poetry Award is presented at the institute.

The program is currently directed by Cathryn Mercier, a reviewer for the Horn Book Magazine and co-author, with Susan Bloom, of Presenting Avi (1997).  Previous directors include Susan Bloom, Gregory Maguire, and Barbara Harrison.

Notable alumni 
Gregory Maguire 1978, author of Wicked
Susan Rich 2003, editor at HarperCollins who persuaded Daniel Handler to take on his Lemony Snicket pseudonym and write for children
Kit Pearson 1981, best-selling Canadian author of The Sky is Falling, Awake and Dreaming among others
Elena Abos 1999, Spanish translator of Holes, as well as the works of Diana Wynne Jones, Margaret Mahy, and Jack Gantos.  Also writes articles for the Horn Book Magazine
Kristin Cashore, author of Graceling
Mackenzi Lee, author of The Gentleman's Guide to Vice and Virtue
A number of judges for the Newbery Medal, the Caldecott Medal, and the Boston Globe-Horn Book Award

Notable faculty
 Nancy Bond
 Anita Silvey

External links
Simmons College Center for the Study of Children's Literature

Children's literature organizations
Simmons University